Arthur Mizener (3 September 1907 – 15 February 1988) was an American  professor of English and literary critic. 
After graduating from Princeton University, he obtained his master's degree from Harvard University before returning to Princeton to receive his doctorate in 1934. After teaching at Yale University; Wells College in Aurora, New York; and Carleton College in Northfield, Minnesota, he joined Cornell in 1951. From then until his retirement in 1975, he was Mellon Foundation Professor of English at Cornell University.

Among his other works, he was the author of the first biography of F. Scott Fitzgerald, The Far Side of Paradise, and a biography of Ford Madox Ford.

References

Harvard University alumni
Princeton University alumni
Cornell University faculty
1907 births
1988 deaths
Yale University faculty
Wells College faculty
Carleton College faculty